Bahimiron was an American black metal band based in Houston, Texas and Phoenix, Arizona, United States. It was formed by vocalist and guitarist David "Grimlord" Herrera in 2001, after leaving the death metal band Imprecation in 1993. Other members of the band included bassist Jenoside and drummer Blaash, who would play in the band from its formation until its dissolution, and second guitarist Luna, who joined Bahimiron in 2013. The band was best known for their second album, Southern Nihilizm, released in 2008. After thirteen years of activity, Bahimiron split-up in 2014.

Bahimiron's style has been labeled as black metal and war metal. Pitchfork's Brandon Stosuy described their sound as "Beherit, Absu, and Gorgoroth in a dusty southern bar brawl". Blabbermouth.net's Scott Alisoglu stated that the band plays "Texas style of dangerously hot black metal that offer one images of decomposing bodies baking in 105-degree temperatures, no doubt the victims of ritual sacrifice."

Members

Final line-up
 Grimlord (David Herrera) – vocals, guitar (2001-2014)
 Jenoside - bass (2001-2014)
 Blaash - drums, percussions (2001-2014) (died 2017)
 Luna (Milton Luna) - guitar (2013-2014)

Former members
 Krag - guitar (2001-2013)

Discography

Studio albums
 Pure Negativism: In Allegiance with Self Wreckage (2006)
 Southern Nihilizm (2008)
 Rebel Hymns of Left Handed Terror (2011)

EPs and splits
 Hunting Down the Weak (2004)
 As the Sun Burns (2004)	 
 Pact in Dizease & Profanation (2006)
 Sargeist / Bahimiron (2006)	 
 Last of the Confederates (2009)

Demos
 Funeral Black (2002)	 
 Terror Division Bloodstrike (2003)	 
 Xrist Gutzlice (2004)

References

External links
 

Musical groups established in 2001
American black metal musical groups
Heavy metal musical groups from Texas
Heavy metal musical groups from Arizona
Musical groups from Houston
Musical groups from Phoenix, Arizona
Musical quartets
Musical groups disestablished in 2014